Schistura disparizona is a species of ray-finned fish in the stone loach genus Schistura from the upper Salween in Yunnan.

References 

D
Fish described in 2005
Taxa named by Zhou Wei (zoologist)
Taxa named by Maurice Kottelat